Walter Metcalf may refer to:
 Walter Metcalf (footballer)
 Walter Metcalf (chemist)